Väinö Karonen (1 May 1898 – 2 June 1972) was a Finnish gymnast. He competed in nine events at the 1924 Summer Olympics.

References

External links
 

1898 births
1972 deaths
Finnish male artistic gymnasts
Olympic gymnasts of Finland
Gymnasts at the 1924 Summer Olympics
Sportspeople from Vyborg
20th-century Finnish people